Takling La is a parallel trek route through the Parana La (pass), located in the Himalayan Mountains. Parana La is the most famous trek route of Spiti and connects Kaza to Karzok. It has an altitude of 18,290 ft (5575 Meters) and follows the traditional trade route between Ladakh and Spiti Valley.

This pass was initially used as a trade route between Spiti and Ladakh and was popular throughout the 19th century. Over the years, it diminished in use. In 1993, Romesh Bhattacharjee led a group of students from Delhi through this pass. According to Bhattacharjee, many points along the trail serve as the passage across the ridge known as Takling La (Pass).

Geography

Takling La is a mountain pass located in the Spiti district of Himachal Pradesh, India. The pass is located in between Pare Chu river and Takshan Nala and is most easily accessible from June through September.

Trek
Takling La trek starts at Kibber village or Kyoto and runs towards the Korzoke village of Tso Morrori, The temperature starts to drop between late August and the beginning of September. Late June to mid-August is best for trekking due to the weather.

See also
Borasu pass
Rupin Pass
Saach Pass
Pin Parvati Pass

External links
Wikimapia
Kaza Hill Station

References

Mountain passes of Himachal Pradesh
Mountain passes of the Himalayas
Geography of Lahaul and Spiti district